The Big Beaver Falls Area School District is a midsized, suburban public school district in Beaver County, Pennsylvania, United States. It serves the City of Beaver Falls, the Boroughs of Big Beaver, Eastvale, Homewood, Koppel and New Galilee and White Township. According to 2000 federal census data, it serves a resident population of 15,260 people. In 2009, the district residents’ per capita income was $14,937, while the median family income was $33,942. In the Commonwealth, the median family income was $49,501 and the United States median family income was $49,445, in 2010.

The district operates: two elementary schools, a middle school and a high school.

Schools
Big Beaver Elementary School (K–5th)
Central Elementary School (K–5th)
Beaver Falls Middle School (6th–8th)
Beaver Falls High School (9th–12th)

Extracurriculars
The district offers a variety of clubs, activities and sports.

Athletics
The main mascot for the district athletic teams is the Tiger and their colors are orange and black. Big Beaver Falls Area is a PIAA District 7 school, and most sports compete in the Class AA division level (with the exception of golf, which competes in the Class AAAA level).

The Tigers compete in the following sports:

Men's Football- 2016-2017 PIAA state champions
Men's Golf
Men's Cross Country
Men's Basketball - PIAA state champions in 1970, 1994, 2005, 2013
Men's Baseball
Men's Swimming and Diving
Men's and Women's Track and Field
Men's and Women's Bowling-(started in 2007)
Women's Volleyball
Women's Tennis
Women's Cross Country
Women's Basketball
Women's Softball
Women's Swimming and Diving

References

External links
Big Beaver Falls Area School District Homepage
Beaver Falls High School Baseball

School districts in Beaver County, Pennsylvania
Education in Pittsburgh area
Beaver Falls, Pennsylvania
School districts established in 1867
1867 establishments in Pennsylvania